Giancarlo Scottà (born 11 April 1953, in Vittorio Veneto) is an Italian politician from Veneto.

A member of Liga Veneta-Lega Nord, Scottà was Mayor of Vittorio Veneto from 1999 to 2009. At the 2009 European election he was elected to the European Parliament.

References

Politicians of Veneto
1953 births
Living people
Venetist politicians
Mayors of places in Veneto
MEPs for Italy 2009–2014
MEPs for Italy 2014–2019
21st-century Italian politicians
People from Vittorio Veneto
Lega Nord MEPs
20th-century Italian politicians